Vikos, also known as Vitsiko, is a village in the Central Zagori municipal unit in Ioannina regional unit, Greece.  It lies at the northern end of the Vikos Gorge.  A paved path leads from the village to the Voidomatis springs in the gorge.

References 

Populated places in Ioannina (regional unit)